Etaballia dubia is a species of flowering plant in the family Fabaceae native to northern South America. It belongs to the subfamily Faboideae, and was recently assigned to the informal monophyletic Pterocarpus clade of the Dalbergieae. It is the only member of the genus Etaballia.

References

Dalbergieae
Monotypic Fabaceae genera